Cynthia Margaret "Cindy" Neale-Ishoy (born 19 June 1952) is a Canadian equestrian. She was born in Edmonton.

She was a member of the Canadian Equestrian Team in dressage at the 1988 Summer Olympics in Seoul.  She placed fourth in individual dressage, and won a bronze medal in team dressage with teammates Eva Pracht, Ashley Nicoll-Holzer and Gina Smith. A six time Olympian, she also competed at the 1972, 1992 and 2004 Summer Olympics, as well as qualifying for the boycotted 1980 Olympics and the 2008 Athens Olympics

.

References

External links

1952 births
Living people
Canadian female equestrians
Canadian dressage riders
Equestrians at the 1972 Summer Olympics
Equestrians at the 1988 Summer Olympics
Equestrians at the 1992 Summer Olympics
Equestrians at the 2004 Summer Olympics
Olympic bronze medalists for Canada
Olympic equestrians of Canada
Olympic medalists in equestrian
Sportspeople from Edmonton
Medalists at the 1988 Summer Olympics
Equestrians at the 1971 Pan American Games
Pan American Games gold medalists for Canada
Pan American Games medalists in equestrian
Medalists at the 1971 Pan American Games
20th-century Canadian women
21st-century Canadian women